Scott Davis and David Pate were the defending champions, but lost in the semifinals to Kent Kinnear and Sven Salumaa.

Ken Flach and Robert Seguso won the title by defeating Kinnear and Salumaa 7–6, 6–4 in the final.

Seeds
The first four seeds received a bye into the second round.

Draw

Finals

Top half

Bottom half

References

External links
 Official results archive (ATP)
 Official results archive (ITF)

1991 Doubles
GTE U.S. Men's Hard Court Championships,1991,Doubles